The Strong River is a  river in south-central Mississippi in the United States.  It is a tributary of the Pearl River, which flows to the Gulf of Mexico.

Course
and flows generally to the southwest through Smith, Rankin and Simpson counties, past the town of D'Lo.

The Strong River takes its name from the English translation of the Choctaw words boke or boge homi, which means "bitter creek" or "strong tasting creek", a result of the tannic acid dissolved in the water by decomposing leaves. The name has nothing to do with the velocity of the stream.

See also
List of Mississippi rivers

References
Notes

Sources
Columbia Gazetteer of North America entry

Rivers of Mississippi
Landforms of Rankin County, Mississippi
Landforms of Scott County, Mississippi
Landforms of Simpson County, Mississippi
Landforms of Smith County, Mississippi
Tributaries of the Pearl River (Mississippi–Louisiana)
Mississippi placenames of Native American origin